The men's 100m backstroke S11 event at the 2012 Summer Paralympics took place at the  London Aquatics Centre on 2 September. There were two heats; the swimmers with the eight fastest times advanced to the final.

Results

Heats
Competed from 10:22.

Heat 1

Heat 2

Final
Competed at 18:04.

 
Q = qualified for final. EU = European Record.

References
Official London 2012 Paralympics Results: Heats 
Official London 2012 Paralympics Results: Final 

Swimming at the 2012 Summer Paralympics